Proja (Cyrillic: Проја) is a Serbian dish made of corn flour, baking powder, sunflower oil, sparkling water and salt. Proha is an alternative name used in Bosnia and Herzegovina.

It has been popular in times of widespread poverty, mostly before the 1950s, and remains a common everyday meal. It is often mistaken with projara, a somewhat fancier variant of proja, which includes the additional ingredients flour, eggs and yogurt.

The ingredients should be mixed together, and baked in a greased pan (which should be 5 cm high) until golden. Best served with kajmak and sour cream.

See also
 List of quick breads

External links
Proja recepti

Balkan cuisine
Quick breads
National dishes